Death the Victor (German:Sieger Tod) is a 1920 German silent film directed by Nils Olaf Chrisander and starring Uschi Elleot, Werner Krauss and Johannes Riemann.

Cast
In alphabetical order
 Uschi Elleot as Eva  
 Werner Krauss as Dr. Olaf Karsten  
 Johannes Riemann as Harald Gorrit  
 Ernst Stahl-Nachbaur as Prof. Ernst Gorrit  
 Ilse Wilke as Evas Mutter

References

External links

1920 films
Films of the Weimar Republic
Films directed by Nils Olaf Chrisander
German silent feature films
Films produced by Erich Pommer
German black-and-white films